This is a list of compositions by the Brazilian composer Heitor Villa-Lobos. It is still incomplete (he composed over 2000 works in his lifetime), and needs expansion. You can help. (More nearly complete lists of compositions may be found in the References or External Links listed below).

Chôros

Introdução aos Chôros (Introduction to the Chôros), for guitar & orchestra (1929)
Chôros No. 1 for guitar (1920)
Chôros No. 2 for flute and clarinet (1924)
Chôros No. 3 "Pica-páo" (Woodpecker) for clarinet, bassoon, saxophone, 3 horns, and trombone, or for male chorus, or for both together (1925)
Chôros No. 4 for 3 horns and trombone (1926)
Chôros No. 5 for piano (1925) "Alma brasileira" (Brazilian Soul)
Chôros No. 6 for orchestra (1926)
Chôros No. 7 "Settimino" (Septet) for flute, oboe, clarinet, saxophone, bassoon, violin, and cello, with tam-tam ad lib. (1924)
Chôros No. 8 for orchestra with 2 pianos (1925)
Chôros No. 9 for orchestra (1929)
Chôros No. 10 for chorus and orchestra (1926) "Rasga o coração" (Tear Out the Heart)
Chôros No. 11 for piano and orchestra (1928)
Chôros No. 12 for orchestra (1929)
Chôros No. 13 for 2 orchestras and band (1929) now lost
Chôros No. 14 for orchestra, band and chorus (1928) now lost
Chôros bis, for violin and cello (1928–29)
Quinteto (em forma de chôros) for flute, oboe, cor anglais, clarinet and bassoon (1928); arr. flute, oboe, clarinet, horn, bassoon (1951)

Bachianas Brasileiras

No. 1 for at least 8 cellos (1930–38)
No. 2 for orchestra (1930)
No. 3 for piano and orchestra (1938)
No. 4 for piano (1930–41); orchestrated in 1941
No. 5 for voice and at least 8 cellos (1938–45)
No. 6 for flute and bassoon (1938)
No. 7 for orchestra (1942)
No. 8 for orchestra (1944)
No. 9 for chorus or string orchestra (1945)

Concertos

Suite for Piano and Orchestra (1913)
Cello Concerto No. 1 (1915)
Fantasia de movimentos mistos for violin & orchestra (1921)
O Martírio dos Insetos for violin and orchestra (1925)
Momoprecoce, fantasy for piano and orchestra (1929) or band (1931)
Ciranda das sete notas for bassoon & string orchestra (1933)
Piano Concerto No. 1 (1945)
Piano Concerto No. 2 (1948)
Fantasia for saxophone, three horns, and strings (1948)
Guitar Concerto (1951) for Segovia
Piano Concerto No. 3 (1952–57)
Piano Concerto No. 4 (1952)
Harp Concerto (1953) for Zabaleta
Cello Concerto No. 2 (1953)
Piano Concerto No. 5 (1954)
Fantasia for Cello and Orchestra
Harmonica Concerto (1955) for John Sebastian Snr.
Concerto Grosso for wind quartet & wind ensemble (1959)
Chôros No. 11 and Bachianas Brasileiras No. 3 are also concertante pieces for piano and orchestra

Symphonies

No. 1 O Imprevisto (The Unforeseen) (1916)
No. 2 Ascensão (Ascension) (1917–44)
No. 3 A Guerra (War) (1919)
No. 4 A Vitória (Victory) (1919)
No. 5 A Paz (Peace) (1920) now lost
No. 6 Sobre a linha das montanhas do Brasil (On the Outline of the Mountains of Brasil) (1944)
No. 7 Odisséia da paz (Peace Odyssey) (1945)
No. 8 (1950)
No. 9 (1952)
No. 10 "Sumé Pater Patrium" (Sinfonia ameríndia) (Sumé, Father of Fathers [Amerindian Symphony]) (1952)
No. 11 (1955)
No. 12 (1957)

Other orchestral works (including ballet scores)

Tédio de Alvorada, symphonic poem (1916), reworked as Uirapuru
Naufrágio de Kleônicos, symphonic poem (1916)
Danças Africanas (1916)
Sinfonietta No. 1 (1916)
Iára (1917)
Amazonas, ballet & symphonic poem (1917)
Uirapuru, ballet and symphonic poem (1917–34)
Dança Frenética (1918)
Dança dos Mosquitos (1922)
Francette et Piá (1928, orch. 1958)
Rudepoêma (1926, orch. 1932)
O Papagaio do moleque, the Kite of the Guttersnipe, a symphonic episode (1932)
Caixinha de Boas Festas, symphonic poem & ballet (1932)
Evolução dos Aeroplanos (1932)
Dança da Terra, ballet (1939)
Mandu-Çarará, secular cantata / children's ballet for mixed choir, children's choir & orchestra (1940)
Suíte Saudade da Juventude No. 1 (1940)
Madona, symphonic poem (1945)
Sinfonietta No. 2 (1947)
Erosão (Erosion), symphonic poem (1950)
Rudá, symphonic poem & ballet (1951)
Ouverture de L'Homme Tel (1952)
Alvorada na Floresta Tropical, ouverture (1953)
Odisseia de uma raça, symphonic poem (1953)
Gênesis, symphonic poem & ballet (1954)
Emperor Jones, a ballet (1956)
Fantasia em Três Movimentos (in the form of a choros) for wind band (1958)
Suite No. 1 for chamber orchestra (1959)
Suite No. 2 for chamber orchestra (1959)

Chamber music
(Information on the two Sextetos místicos in )

Sonate-fantaisie No. 1 for violin and piano, Desesperança (Despair) (1913)
Sonate-fantaisie No. 2 for violin and piano (1914)
Sonata for violin and piano No. 3 (1920)
Sonata for violin and piano No. 4 (1923)
Trio for piano and strings No. 1 (1911)
Trio for piano and strings No. 2 (1915)
Trio for piano and strings No. 3 (1918)
Sexteto místico, for flute, oboe, saxophone, harp, celesta and guitar (1917, unfinished or lost)
Sexteto místico, for flute, oboe, saxophone, harp, celesta and guitar (ca. 1955, replacement)
Quarteto simbólico (Impressões da vida mundana), for flute, alto saxophone, harp, celesta and female voices (1921)
Trio for oboe, clarinet & bassoon (1921)
Nonetto, Impressão rápida de todo o Brasil (A Brief Impression of the Whole of Brazil) (1923)
Quinteto em forma de choros for flute, oboe, clarinet, English horn or horn and bassoon (1928)
Quatuor, for flute, oboe, clarinet and bassoon (1928)
Distribuição de Flores for flute and guitar (1937)
Trio for violin, viola and cello (1945)
Divagacão for cello, piano and bass drum (adlib.) (1946)
Duo for violin and viola (1946)
Assobio a Jato ("The Jet Whistle") for flute and cello (1950)
Fantaisie concertante for piano, clarinet and bassoon (1953)
Duo for oboe and bassoon (1957)
Quinteto Instrumental for flute, violin, viola, cello and harp (1957)
Fantasia Concertante for 16 or 32 cellos (1958)
Chôros Nos. 2,3,4,7 and Bachianas Brasileiras Nos. 1 and 6 are also chamber works

String quartets

Suíte graciosa (5 March 1915)
Andante
Allegretto
Grega Cançonette
String Quartet No. 1, revised from the Suíte graciosa (1946)
Cantilena
Brincadeira
Canto lírico
Cançoneta
Melancolia
Saltando como um Saci
String Quartet No. 2 (1915)
String Quartet No. 3, Quarteto de pipocas (1917)
String Quartet No. 4 (1917)
String Quartet No. 5, Quarteto popular no. 1 (1931)
String Quartet No. 6, Brazilian (1938)
String Quartet No. 7 (1942)
String Quartet No. 8 (1944)
String Quartet No. 9 (1945)
String Quartet No. 10 (1946)
String Quartet No. 11 (1948)
String Quartet No. 12 (1950)
String Quartet No. 13 (1951)
String Quartet No. 14 (1953)
String Quartet No. 15 (1954)
String Quartet No. 16 (1955)
String Quartet No. 17 (1957)
Villa Lobos left sketches for an 18th String Quartet.

Sacred and other choral works 
Missa São Sebastião, for three voices (1936-37)
Ave Maria
for five voices (1938)
for six voices (1948)
Pater Noster, for four voices (1950)
Panis Angelicus, for four voices (1950)
Sub Tuum Praesidium, for four voices  (1952)
Praesepe, for four voices (1952)
Cor Dulce, Cor Amabile, for four voices (1952)
Magnificat-Alleluia, for mezzo soprano, chorus and orchestra  (1958)
Bendita Sabedoria, for six voices (1958)

Songs (with piano) 
Miniaturas, six songs for voice and piano (1912–1917)
    Chromo No.2
    Viola
    Chromo No.3
    Sonho
    Japonezas
    Sino de Aldeia 

Ave Maria (1914)

Padre Nosso (1914)

Il Bove (1916)

A Cascavel (1917)

Amor y perfidia (1918)

Sertão No Estio (1919)

Tres Historietas (1920)
1. Lune D'octobre
2. O Novelozinho De Linha
3. Solidão

Epigramas irônicos e sentimentais, eight songs (1921-1923)
    Eis a vida!
    Inutil epigrama
    Sonho de uma noite de verão
    Epigrama
    Perversidade
    Pudor
    Imagem
    Verdade 

Serestas, fourteen songs (1925-26, "Vôo" and "Serenata" added 1943)
    Pobre cega
    Anjo da guarda
    Canção da folha morta
    Saudades da minha vida
    Modinha
    Na paz do outono
    Cantiga do viúvo
    Canção do carreiro ou Canção de um crepúsculo caricioso (sobre themas selvagens dos boiadeiros e carreiros, entre os índios e mamelucos do Brasil)
    Abril
    Desejo
    Redondilha
    Realejo
    Vôo
    Serenata 

Coleção Brasileira, two songs(?) (1925)
Tempos Atras
Tristeza

Canções Indigenas, three songs (1926)
Canide Ioune Sabath (Ave amarela, canção elegíaca) (Melody collected in the 16th century by Jean de Léry) 
Teiru (Canto fúnebre pela morte de um cacique) 
A Iara

Canções típicas brasileiras, thirteen songs (1929–1935)
Môkôcê cê-maká... (Dorme na rêde...). Canção para acalentar as criancinhas entre os Índios Paricis 
Nozani-ná. Canto dos indios Paricis da Serra do Norte (Matto Grosso),
Papae Curumiassú
Xangô. Canto fetiche de Makumba
Estrella é lua nóva. Canto fetiche de Makumba
Vióla quebrada. Modinha de M. de A.
Adeus Êma, Desafio. Théma populaire du Nord de Minas Geraes
Pállida Madona.   Modinha antiga 
Tu passaste por este jardim... Modinha carioca, Thema de Alfredo Dutra 
Cabocla de Caxangá
Pássaro fugitivo
Itabaiana
Onde o nosso amor nasceu

As Filhas de Maria (1930)

Modinhas e canções, song cycle(s) for voice and piano
Album 1, seven songs (1935–1943)
Canção do marinheiro (a maneira do genero ibérico de 1500, versos originaes da época) (1936)
Lundú da Marqueza de Santos (evocando a época - 1822) (1940)
Cantilena (Um canto que saiu das senzalas) (1936)
A gatinha parda (Sobre um tema infantil popular do século XIX) (1941)
Remeiro de São Francisco (Canto dos mestiços do Rio S. Francisco da Baia)
Nhapopê (modinha antiga, sobre um tema popular) (1935)
Evocação (1943) 

Album 2, six songs (1943)
Pobre peregrino
Vida formosa
Nésta rua
Manda tiro, tiro lá
João Cambuête
Na corda da viola

Duas Paisagens, two songs (1946)
Manhã Na Praia
Tarde Na Glória

Bonsoir Paris! (1948)

Canção do Poeta do Século XVIII (1948)

Canção De Cristal (1950)

Samba Clássico (1950)

Jardim Fanado (1955)

Sete Vezes (1959)

Songs (with orchestra) 
Serestas (1925–26) (orchestral version of voice and piano original above)

Modinhas e canções, song cycle(s) for voice and orchestra
Album 1, seven songs (1943) (orchestral version of voice and piano original above)
Album 2, six songs (1958-59) (orchestral version of voice and piano original above)

Sete Vezes (1959)  (orchestral version of voice and piano original above)

Operas
Aglaia (1909), incorporated into Izaht
Elisa (1910), incorporated into Izaht
Comédia lírica em 3 atos (1911)
Izaht (1914)
Jesus (1918)
Malazarte (1921)
Magdalena, light opera (1947)
Yerma (1955)
A Menina das Nuvens (The Girl of the Clouds), light opera (1957–58)

Ballets
see: other orchestral works

Music for films
Descobrimento do Brasil (Discovery of Brazil) (1938)
Green Mansions (1959) (adapted as the concert work Floresta do Amazonas [Forest of the Amazon])

Works for guitar solo
Information on the newly discovered 1928 Valsa-chôro from https://web.archive.org/web/20070218094019/http://durand-salabert-eschig.com/actualite.html, (accessed 4 December 2006).
Panqueca (1900)
Mazurka em ré maior (1901)
Valsa brilhante (1904) originally titled Valsa concerto No. 2
Fantasia (1909)
Canção brasileira (1910)
Quadrilha (1910)
Tarantela (1910)
Simples, Mazurka (1910)
Dobrados (1909–1912)
Chôro No. 1, "Chôro típico" (1920)
Suíte popular brasileira (1928, rev. 1947–48)
Mazurka-Choro
Schottish-Choro
Valsa-Choro
Gavotta-Choro
Chorinho
Valsa-chôro (ca. 1928) rejected original from the Suíte popular, replaced with a new "Valsa-chôro" in the revision of 1947–48
Douze études (1929; rev. 1948/53)
Etude No. 1 in E minor: Allegro non troppo
Etude No. 2 in A major: Allegro
Etude No. 3 in D major: Allegro moderato
Etude No. 4 in G major: Un peu modéré—Grandioso
Etude No. 5 in C major: Andantino—Poco meno
Etude No. 6 in E minor: Poco Allegro
Etude No. 7 in E major: Tres animé—Moins
Etude No. 8 in C-sharp minor: Modéré
Etude No. 9 in F-sharp minor: Tres peu animé
Etude No. 10 in B minor: Tres animé—Un peu animé—Vif
Etude No. 11 in E minor: Lent—Poco meno—Animé
Etude No. 12 in A minor: Animé—Più mosso—a tempo primo—Un peu plus animé
Valsa sentimental (1936)
Five Preludes (1940)
Prelude No. 1 in E minor ("Melodia lírica"): Andantino espressivo Più mosso
Prelude No. 2 in E major ("Melodia capadócia"): Andantino—Più mosso
Prelude No. 3 in A minor ("Homenagem a Bach"): Andante—Molto adagio e dolorido
Prelude No. 4 in E minor ("Homenagem ao índio brasileiro"): Lento—Animato—Moderato
Prelude No. 5 in D major ("Homenagem à Vida Social"): Poco animato—Meno—Più mosso
Prelude No. 6 (Lost)

Music for piano solo

Celestial, waltz (1904)
Tristorosa, waltz (1910)
Ibericarabe (1914)
Ondulando (1914)
Danças Características Africanas (1915)
Suíte Floral (1918)
Histórias da Carochinha (1919)
A Lenda do Caboclo (1920)
Carnaval das crianças (1920)
A Prole do Bebê, first series (1920)
Branquinha (A Boneca de Louça) – Little White Doll (The Porcelain Doll)
Moreninha (A Boneca de Massa) – Little Brunette Doll (The Paste Doll)
Caboclinha (A Boneca de Barro) – Little Mestiza Doll (The Clay Doll)
Mulatinha (A Boneca de Borracha) – Little Mulatta Doll (The Rubber Doll)
Negrinha (A Boneca de Pau) – Little Black Doll (The Wooden Doll)
A Pobrezinha (A Boneca de Trapo) – The Poor Little Doll (The Rag Doll)
O Polichinelo – The Punch
A Bruxa (A Boneca de Pano) – The Witch (The Cloth Doll)
A Prole do Bebê, second series (1921)
A Baratinha de Papel (The Paper Little Cockroach)
O Gatinho de Papelão (The Box-Paper Kitten)
O Camundongo de Massa (The Paste Mouse)
O Cachorrinho de Borracha (The Rubber Puppy)	
O Cavalinho de Pau (The Wooden Little Horse)
O Boizinho de Chumbo (The Lead Little Bull)
O Passarinho de Pano (The Cloth Little Bird)
O Ursinho de Algodão (The Cotton Little Bear)
O Lobinho de Vidro (The Glass Little Wolf)
A Prole do Bebê, third series (1926) now lost
A Fiandeira (1921)
Rudepoêma (1921–26)
Simples coletânea, W134 (1922)
Sul America (1925)
Cirandinhas (1925)
Zangou-se o Cravo com a Rosa
Adeus, Bela Morena
Vamos, Maninha
Olha Aquela Menina
Senhora Pastora
Cai, Cai, Balão
Todo Mundo Passa
Vamos Ver a Mulatinha
Carneirinho, Carneirão
A Canoa Virou
Nesta Rua tem um Bosque
Lindos Olhos Que Ela Tem
Cirandas (1926)
Terezinha de Jesus
A Condessa – (The Countess)
Senhora Dona Sancha
O Cravo Brigou com a Rosa – (The Carnation Fought The Rose)
Pobre Cega – (Poor Blind Woman)
Passa, Passa Gavião – (Go Away, Go Away, Hawk)
Xô, Xô, Passarinho – (Shoo, Shoo, Little Bird)
Vamos Atrás de Serra, Calunga – Let's Go to the Mountain, Calunga
Fui no Tororó – I went to Tororó
O Pintor de Cannahy – The Painter of Canai
Nesta Rua, Nesta Rua – In This Street
Olha o Passarinho, Dominé – Look at the Little Bird, Dominé
À Procura de uma Agulha – Looking for a Needle
A Canoa Virou – The Canoe Capsized
Que Lindos Olhos! – What Beautiful Eyes!
Có, Có, Có – Cheep, Cheep, Cheep
Saudades das selvas brasileiras (1927)
Bachianas brasileiras No. 4 (1930–41)
Preludio – (Introdução) – Prelude – (Introduction) (1941)
Coral – (Canto do Sertão) – Chorale – (Song of the Country) (1941)
Aria – (Cantiga) – Aria – (Song) (1935)
Dansa – (Miudinho) – Dance – (Miudinho) (1930)
Caixinha de Música Quebrada (1931) – Little Broken Music Box
Francette et Pià (1932)
Valsa da dor (1932)
Guia Prático (1932–49)
Ciclo brasileiro (1936–37)
Plantio do Caboclo – Native Planting Song
Impressões Seresteiras – Minstrel Impressions
Festa no Sertão – Jungle Festival
Dança do Índio Branco – Dance of the White Indian
As Três Marias (1939)
New York Sky-Line Melody (1939)
Poema Singelo (1942)
Homenagem a Chopin (1949)
Nocturne
Ballade

References

External links
Villa-Lobos worklist on IMSLP, a listing sortable by Appleby (W) numbers, titles, instrumentation, dates, etc.
Villa-Lobos: Sua Obra (2009 edition)
Catalog of Villa-Lobos works published by Max Eschig
A database of Villa-Lobos works, listed by category
Heitor Villa-Lobos: A Survey Of His Guitar Music 1996, by Orlando Fraga
Estrura de Frase e Progressão Linear nos Prelúdios 1 e 2 para Violão de Villa-Lobos by Orlando Fraga
Os 12 Estudos para Violão de H.Villa-Lobos Fed. Univ. of Rio de Janeiro – Brazil, 1993 pdf alt. by Krishna Salinas
Fontes Manuscritas e Impressa dos 12 Estudos para Violão de Heitor Villa-Lobos (1997) by Eduardo Meirinhos
Primary Sources And Editions Of Suite Popular Brasileira, Choros No. 1, And Five Preludes, By Heitor Villa-Lobos: A Comparative Survey Of Differences  (2003) by Eduardo Meirinhos
Choro Nr.1 De Heitor Villa-Lobos – Uma Análise Gilberto André Borges (archive from 7 February 2007, accessed 15 February 2016)
A Study of Three Works of Villa-Lobos by Richard Kevin DeVinck

 
Villa-Lobos, Heitor